Rafatullah Mohmand (born 6 November 1976 in Peshawar, North-West Frontier Province) is a Pakistani cricket coach and former cricketer who played as a right-handed batsman and left-arm orthodox bowler. 

He made his Twenty20 International debut for Pakistan against England on 26 November 2015. He was also the oldest player for Pakistan to make T20I debut.

Personal life

His elder brother Asmatullah Mohmand played first-class cricket in Pakistan from 1995 to 2004.

Cricket career
Since his debut in 1996 Mohmand has played as an opening batsman for several first-class teams in Pakistan. He made his first century in 1999-2000 when he scored 213 out of a team total of 395 to help Redco Pakistan Limited to an innings victory over Faisalabad. In 2009-10, opening the batting for Water and Power Development Authority, he made 302 not out against Sui Southern Gas Company, adding 580 for the second wicket with Aamer Sajjad. It is the highest second-wicket partnership, and the second-highest partnership of all, in first-class cricket history.

He toured Australia with Pakistan A in 2006, playing one first-class match and three List A matches.

In 2009 he was invited to play for Afghanistan to strengthen their batting by their coach Kabir Khan, and was included in the 15-member Afghanistan team named ahead of the 2009 ICC World Cup Qualifiers in South Africa. However, Afghanistan withdrew Rafatullah from their squad after deciding he was not eligible to play for them.

In 2012-13 he was the highest scorer in the President's Cup One-Day Tournament, with 425 runs in six matches for Water and Power Development Authority, including three centuries.

In 2017 he was picked as a replacement for Sharjeel Khan by Islamabad United in the 2017 Pakistan Super League.

Coaching career
Since his retirement he has become a coach, including being the assistant coach to the Khyber Pakhtunkhwa U19 Blues.

References

External links
 Rafatullah Mohmand at CricketArchive
 Rafatullah Mohmand at Cricinfo
 "My Patience Is an Example for Future Generations - Raffatullah"

1976 births
Living people
Pakistani cricketers
Pakistan Twenty20 International cricketers
Peshawar cricketers
Redco Pakistan Limited cricketers
Water and Power Development Authority cricketers
Habib Bank Limited cricketers
Khyber Pakhtunkhwa cricketers
Cricketers from Peshawar
Pashtun people
Islamabad United cricketers
Agrani Bank Cricket Club cricketers
Pakistani cricket coaches